NWB is an acronym which can stand for:

 National Westminster Bank, a retail banking subsidiary of NatWest Group
 Nederlandse Waterschapsbank, NWB Bank, the Netherlands water boards bank
 Nederlandse Waterski Bond, the Dutch WaterSki Association
 Non Weight Bearing, where the patient may not touch the ground after surgery
 North Wembley station, London, National Rail station code
 Nuclear whipping boy, the designation of the town of Springfield in The Simpsons